Kim Min-ji may refer to:

 Kim Min-ji (volleyball) (born 1985), South Korean volleyball player
 Kim Min-jee (speed skater) (born 1986), South Korean short track speed skater
 Kim Min-ji (sport shooter) (born 1989), South Korean sport shooter
 Kim Min-ji (actress) (born 1992), South Korean actress
 Kim Min-ji (curler) (born 1999), South Korean curler